Allu Arjun is an Indian actor and media personality who works in Telugu cinema. He has established as one of the popular celebrities in India and also one of the highest paid actors in India. Arjun is also widely known for his dancing and has appeared in more than 25 films. His performance in the films such as Arya (2004), Desamuduru (2007), Parugu (2008), Vedam (2010), Race Gurram (2014), Rudhramadevi (2015) and Ala Vaikunthapurramuloo (2020) fetched him various accolades including six CineMAA Awards, six Filmfare South Awards, three Nandi Awards and three SIIMA awards.

CineMAA Awards

Filmfare Awards South

IIFA Utsavam

Mirchi Music Awards South

Nandi Awards

Sakshi Excellence Awards

Santosham Film Awards

South Indian International Movie Awards

South Scope Lifestyle Awards

TSR– TV9 National Film Awards

Zee Cine Awards Telugu

See also 

 Allu Arjun filmography

References 

Allu Arjun